One Billion Rising is a global campaign, founded by Eve Ensler, to end rape and sexual violence against women. It was started in 2012 as part of the V-Day movement. The "billion" refers to the UN statistic that one in three women will be raped or beaten in her lifetime, or about one billion. The campaign expands each year.  In 2016, the theme of the campaign is Rise for Revolution.  "This year's campaign will escalate the collective actions of activists worldwide, and amplify their call for systematic changes towards ending violence against women and children once and for all," said OBR global director Monique Wilson.

Founding

The campaign was initiated by playwright and activist Eve Ensler (known for her play The Vagina Monologues), and her organization V-Day. It was partly inspired by Missouri congressman Todd Akin's "legitimate rape" and pregnancy comments. Shocked by Akin's remarks, Ensler wrote an open letter in response.

History

2012
In 2012, the One Billion Rising campaign culminated in the biggest mass global action to end violence against women ever with tens of thousands of events held. Singer/songwriter Tena Clark produced a music video entitled "Break the Chain", to accompany the campaign.

On September 20, 2012, people from 160 countries had signed up to take part in the campaign.

Around 5,000 organizations have joined the campaign, which has also been aided or endorsed by religious ministers, movement builders, actors Rosario Dawson, Robert Redford, and Stella Creasy, British Labour Co-operative politician.

In a video message dedicated to Jyoti Singh, the Indian student who died in December after she was gang-raped by six men on a Delhi bus, Anoushka Shankar disclosed she had been abused by a trusted friend of her parents over several years when she was a child. In her message she said she did not believe she will ever recover from the abuse she had suffered: "...as a woman I find I'm frequently living in fear, afraid to walk along at night, afraid to answer a man who asks for the time, afraid I'm going to be judged or treated in ways based on the way I might choose to dress or the make up I might choose to wear, and you know, enough is enough. I'm rising for women like Jyoti, for women like her, with the amazing women of my country I'm rising for the child in me who I don't think will ever fully recover from what happened to her."

2013

On February 14, 2013, the rally was held in more than 190 countries. The one-day event was held after a call for one billion women around the world to join to dance in a show of collective strength. The event was held on the 15th anniversary of the V-Day movement. The word "billion" refers the  statistic that one in three women will be raped or beaten in their lifetime, or about one billion.

2014
Known as One Billion Rising for Justice, the event was held in February 2014. Bollywood Superstar Aamir Khan, who had earlier voiced such issues through his debut TV Show Satyamev Jayate,  lent his support to One Billion Rising Campaign in New Delhi. In Los Angeles, a number of events were held in protest of violence against women soldiers and prisoners. A number of celebrities participated, including Jane Fonda, Anne Hathaway, Marisa Tomei, and Dylan McDermott.

2015
Known as One Billion Rising Revolution, more than 200 countries participated. In Italy, more than 100 cities had events and all 34 provinces of Afghanistan had events.

Kimberlé Crenshaw, prominent Critical Race Theory figure and professor at UCLA School of Law and Columbia Law School, has associated with One Billion Rising to help create awareness of the difficulties girls of color face in New York and Boston schools. These issues include the school-to-prison pipeline, stereotyping, and the disparity of the suspension rationales and rates compared to white girls (the rates being 10 times more likely for the former).

2016
According to the campaign, "For the fourth year, globally One Billion Rising activists are planning their rising events, artistic uprisings, panel discussions, press conference, town halls, movies, articles, gatherings, poetry, art, posters, actions, and protests to take place on and about Feb 14th.  With the theme – One Billion Rising: Rise for Revolution 2016, this year's campaign will escalate the collective actions of activists worldwide, and amplify their call for systemic changes towards ending violence against women and girls once and for all.

Rising events will continue to focus on highlighting and creating bold artistic initiatives that reflect the actions taking place in communities.  The theme Rise for Revolution allows creative and artistic expressions, multi-sectoral involvement, and provides a unique space to engage people from all walks of life. It allows the use of imagination, art and political actions – and allows everyone the freedom to localise their campaigns. REVOLUTION can bring everyone from the personal to the political – from the "I" to the "We". It harnesses collective energy because it is hopeful and envisions possibilities and a future."

2017
The 2017 event was held in February.

Video
In September 2014, the campaign released the One Billion Rising for Justice video which includes footage from amateur and professional videographers from around the world, as well as interviews with global coordinators. In January of 2015, the "Rising" video premiered at the Sundance Film Festival in Park City, Utah. For 2016, the "Rising Revolution" Video Series was released featuring a range of videos that "showcase the collective energy of Revolution by highlighting artistic expressions and RISING victories from around the world with more being added as the campaign unfolds."

Global coordinators
 Monique Wilson – Director
 Abha Bhaiya / Sangat South Asian Feminist Network – India
 Amy Oyekunle – Nigeria
 Andres Naime – Mexico
 Anne-Christine d'Adesky – Haiti
 Colani Hlatjwako – Swaziland
 Dianne Madray – Caribbean: St Lucia, Jamaica, Trinidad, Guyana
 Fahima Hashim – Sudan
 Fartuun A. Adan – Somalia
 Iman Aoun – Palestine
 Isatou Touray – The Gambia
 Jason Day – Peru
 Jessica Montoya – Santa Fe, United States
 Kamla Bhasin / Sangat South Asian Feminist Network – South Asia
 Karabo Tshikube – South Africa
 Khushi Kabir – Bangladesh
 Marsha Pamela Lopez Calderon – Central and South America
 Marya Meyer – Miami, United States
 Nico Corradini – Italy
 Nyasha Sengayi – Zimbabwe
 Rada Borić – Albania, Bosnia and Herzegovina, Bulgaria, Croatia, Cyprus, Greece, Macedonia, Montenegro, Romania, Serbia and Slovenia

See also
 List of anti-sexual assault organizations in the United States
 Feminist movement
 2012 Delhi gang rape case
 Post-assault treatment of sexual assault victims
 Violence Against Women Act
 A Rapist in Your Path
 War on Women

References

External links

Official website
List of cooperating organizations
Endorsement video message by Robert Redford at The Guardian newspaper website
September 24, 2012 video interview with Eve Ensler at Democracy Now!
February 14, 2013 video interview with Eve Ensler at Democracy Now!

Sexual abuse victims advocacy
International women's organizations
Annual protests
Women's marches
Fourth-wave feminism